Transport for Brisbane, previously called Brisbane Transport, is an organisational division of the Brisbane City Council, responsible through its related Council Committee for providing policy and advice to Brisbane City Council, and for delivering various public transport services across the City of Brisbane. The division does this as part of an agreement with TransLink, an agency of the Department of Transport and Main Roads that operates public transport across South East Queensland.

History

The origins of Transport for Brisbane (formerly, Brisbane Transport) can be traced to August 1885 where the Metropolitan Tramways & Investment Company established a service in Brisbane under franchise from the Queensland Government with 18 horse trams. The tram system remained in private hands until January 1923 when the Queensland government established the Brisbane Tramways Trust, compulsorily acquiring the tram network and supporting infrastructure, then in 1925 creating the Brisbane City Council and transferring responsibility for the tram network to the council.

Bus services commenced in 1925 by the Brisbane City Council. Brisbane City Council shut down bus services due to financial loss in November 1927. Bus services recommenced 13 years later, in July 1940 with 12 Albion Valkyries. In 1948 the Brisbane City Council acquired 20 operators with 67 buses.

The first Rocket services began on the morning of 18 April 1977 between Garden City and the Brisbane CBD. These services were based on the idea that bus travel time could be reduced to less than the travel time by car by the removal of most embarkation stops.

In the 1990s, Brisbane City Council corporatised its transport services to form Brisbane Transport, a council-owned commercial businesses managed at arm's length from the council and providing consultancy services back to it.

Infrastructure

Transport for Brisbane operates services along dedicated busway infrastructure to avoid peak hour traffic congestion on roads closest to the Brisbane CBD.

Services

BUZ (bus upgrade zone)

Bus upgrade zones (BUZ) are high-frequency bus routes mostly running direct to the Cultural Centre. All BUZ services run at least every fifteen minutes from around 06:00 to 23:00 seven days a week and at least every ten minutes during peak hours from Monday to Friday.
Except for the 199 BUZ, all other BUZ services operate on a limited stop basis (express service).

CityGlider

CityGlider is a high frequency bus service around the Brisbane CBD, operating every five minutes during peak and every 10 to 15 minutes during off-peak. The service is pre-paid, meaning you can't buy any tickets on the bus, you must have already purchased a ticket, or have a go card to pay for your fare. This is the first service in Brisbane to operate 24 hours on Friday and Saturday and 18 hours every other day. Bus stops serviced by the CityGlider are identified with signs and painted kerb.

City Centre Free Loops
The free City Loop, Spring Hill Loop and South Brisbane Loop bus services provide high frequency public transport access within the Brisbane Central Business District (CBD), at no cost to riders. Services also run between the CBD and Spring Hill areas and through South Brisbane and West End. 

The City Loop operates in a clockwise (route 40) and anti-clockwise (route 50) direction. The City Loop uses distinctive purple buses and stop at the purple signposted bus stops.

The South Brisbane bus loop travels in an anti-clockwise direction along Grey Street, Montague Road, Vulture Street and Tribune Street. The bus stops were re-branded to a distinctive green and white stripe pattern.

The Spring Hill Loop service (route 30) between Brisbane City and Spring Hill runs on a continuous loop between the CBD and Spring Hill precincts. Distinctive yellow buses stop at the yellow signposted bus stops.

Rocket
Rocket is a peak hour service operating in the direction of peak (towards the city in the mornings, and away from the city in the evenings), with limited stops.  
You can identify the stops for the Rocket service by the smaller "Rocket" sign shown under the standard bus stop sign.

Clem7
Clem7 (Route 77) is a bus route using the Clem Jones Tunnel (Clem7) which links the suburbs of Eight Mile Plains and Chermside. It runs every 15 minutes at peak times and 30 minutes off-peak, Monday to Friday.

The route commenced on 22 March 2010 at a cost of $1.6 million per annum. It has decreased the journey time between Eight Mile Plains and Chermside, removing the need to transfer at Cultural Centre. The route completes the  cross-city journey in 39 minutes instead of up to 55 minutes via the Brisbane CBD.

Fleet

Rigid buses
MAN 18.310s, Volvo B7RLEs and later Volvo B8RLEs make up the majority part of the rigid bus fleet of Brisbane Transport.

A total of 390 18.310s joined the Brisbane Transport fleet from 2005 to 2010, with 324 fitted with CNG (Compressed Natural Gas) engines (Fleet numbers 1200 to 1523) and 66 powered by diesel (Fleet numbers 1001 to 1066). Buses 1001 to 1015 were on loan to South West Transit, 1019 to 1029 were on loan to Hornibrook Bus Lines services since 2012, and returned to Brisbane Transport in July 2021. CNG powered buses are starting to pull off from service starting from 2019.

The rest of the regular rigid fleet are all Volvos, including 553 diesel-powered B7RLEs (delivered from 2009 to 2018, fleet numbers 1801 to 2353, two withdrawn from service due to accidents in 2017 and 2020). 139 Volvo B8RLEs (delivered from 2017 to 2021, numbers 2801 to 2939)  and one Volvo B5RLEH Hybrid demonstrator bus (introduced in 2015, fleet number 1595), all low-floor, accessible and air-conditioned.

In October 2020, the last Scania L94UB, the first CNG and low floor bus was retired after 20 years of service. In total 217 were made with two lost due to accidents in 2003 and in 2009 when the bus exploded due to a problem with the CNG engine. This has led the Brisbane City Council to retire all gas powered buses by 2027.

Four Yutong E12 battery electric buses will operate on trial with Brisbane Transport, starting from June 2021 on the City Loop free services.

The supply of Volvo buses from Volgren came to an end in June 2021, where this contract started in 2009 across a 12-year period, with the first delivery of a Volvo B7RLE (fleet number 1801); while the final bus in the contract is a Volvo B8RLE (fleet number 2939) which is the 882nd bus built.

In 2020, one third of buses were powered by natural gas. By 2027 all gas powered buses will be phased out.

Tag axle buses
BT operates two models of tag axle buses, 8 Scania K310UB (delivered in early 2009, fleet numbers 1701 to 1708 and later renumbered as 5001 to 5008) and 149 Volvo B12BLE (delivered from 2010 to 2013, fleet numbers 5009 to 5157), both diesel-powered and delivered from 2009 on. These larger buses are used on high-demand trunk routes, mostly on the South East Busway.

Articulated buses
Articulated buses currently used by Transport for Brisbane are 30 CNG-powered MAN NG313s (Fleet numbers 1601 to 1630), delivered from 2007 to 2008 and 20 diesel-powered Volvo B8RLEAs (Fleet numbers 1631 to 1650), delivered in 2018.

A further batch of 20 B8RLEAs (Fleet numbers 1651 to 1670) has started to deliver in early 2020, 1651 and 1652 entered service in April 2020; while 1653, 1662 to 1670 entered service in March 2021. Since 12 July 2021, 1653 and the remaining 8 new artics (Fleet numbers 1654 to 1661) joined the Blue CityGlider Route 60 fleet to replace the rigid B8RLEs (Fleet numbers 2820 to 2838), while 1662 to 1670 joined the CityGlider fleet progressively to replace all the rigid B8RLEs in late 2021.

Historic

Until the mid-1970s, heavy-duty AEC and Leyland buses were purchased. Later purchases were from European suppliers, Volvo B59s being purchased from 1976, MAN SL200s in 1982 and Volvo B10Ms from 1987.

Depots
Transport for Brisbane operates its services from seven depots for specified areas. Some of these depots service routes shared in overlapping areas with other depots. Generally, each of Transport for Brisbane's buses is allocated to a particular depot, displaying a letter prefix for that depot before its fleet number, and hence is assigned to specific routes.

Former depots

Accidents and incidents
On 28 October 2016, a Volvo B7RLE, S1980, was set a light by 48 year old Anthony O'Donohue. The driver, 29 year old Manmeet Sharma, was killed in his seat while all of the passengers were safely evacuated with some receiving minor injuries. Mr. O'Donohue was found to be suffering from mental health problems and was charge with the murder of the driver and multiple counts of attempted murder. Following the fire, the bus was destroyed and the fleet number '1980' was permanently retired from the company. All buses manufactured after 2005 were to receive a physical barrier for the driver and all buses in the fleet were to receive more CCTV cameras and better signage to help with evacuation process on any of the companies buses.

See also

Bus transport in Queensland
Transport in Brisbane

References

External links
Brisbane City Council
Translink timetables
Showbus gallery

Bus companies of Queensland
Public transport in Brisbane
Translink (Queensland)
1925 establishments in Australia